Raimond de Beccarie de Pavie, baron (Seigneur) de Fourquevaux was a French soldier, politician, and diplomat.

The baron de Fourquevaux was born in Toulouse on 29 September 1508. He held many posts in the French government of the time, including that of the governor of Narbonne, an Ambassador to Spain, and as a Capitoul of Toulouse. He was known as Raymond Beccaria, Raymond de Rouer, and Raimond de Beccarie de Pavie. He was the author of Instructions sur le faict de la Guerre (Paris: Michel Vascosan pour Galliot du Pré, 1548).

De Fourquevaux died in Narbonne on 4 July 1574.

Extracts in English translation Beatrice Heuser: The Strategy Makers: Thoughts on War and Society from Machiavelli to Clausewitz (Santa Monica, CA: Greenwood/Praeger, 2010), pp. 32–49

Bibliography 

 
 
 
 
 
 DOUAIS, Célestin, Lettres de Charles IX à M. de Fourquevaux ambassadeur en Espagne (1565-1572), Paris, A. Picard, 1897, 1 volume, 443 pages, éditées à partir des copies réalisées par Villeroy (ms. Fr. 16103) et les originaux du château de Fourquevaux.
DOUAIS, Célestin, Une importante correspondance du seizième siècle : le baron de Fourquevaux, Paris, Alphonse Picard (Toulouse, Édouard Privat), 1891.
 
 
RIBERA, Jean-Michel, Diplomatie et espionnage : les ambassadeurs du roi de France auprès de Philippe II du traité de Cateau-Cambrésis, 1559, à la mort de Henri II, 1589, Paris, Honoré Champion Éditeur, 2007.
TETEL, Marcel, « De l’auteur des "Instructions sur le faict de la guerre", in Louis Terreaux, éd., Culture et pouvoir au temps de l’Humanisme et de la Renaissance, Actes du Congrès Marguerite de Savoie – Annecy, Chambéry,Turin 29 avril-4 mai 1974, Paris, Champion, Genève, Slatkine, 1978, pp. 271–284.

References 

1508 births
1574 deaths
16th-century French writers
16th-century male writers
Barons of France
French male writers
16th-century French diplomats
Military personnel from Toulouse
Politicians from Toulouse